With Open Eyes is a 1995 art gallery program developed by American studio The Voyager Company for Macintosh, Pippin, and Windows 3.x.

Critical reception

References

1995 software
Macintosh software